Queralt Gómez Sariol (born 27 May 1997) is a Spanish footballer who plays as a defender for Apollon Ladies F.C.

Club career
Gómez started her career at Espanyol B.

References

External links
Profile at La Liga

1997 births
Living people
Women's association football defenders
Spanish women's footballers
People from Vallès Oriental
Sportspeople from the Province of Barcelona
Footballers from Catalonia
Sportswomen from Catalonia
FC Barcelona Femení B players
SD Eibar Femenino players
Primera División (women) players
Segunda Federación (women) players
Spain women's youth international footballers
21st-century Spanish women